The powers of the police in England and Wales are defined largely by statute law, with the main sources of power being the Police and Criminal Evidence Act 1984 and the Police Act 1996. This article covers the powers of police officers of territorial police forces only, but a police officer in one of the UK's special police forces (most commonly a member of the British Transport Police) can utilise extended jurisdiction powers outside of their normal jurisdiction in certain defined situations as set out in statute.  In law, police powers are given to constables (both full-time and volunteer special constables). All police officers in England and Wales are "constables" in law whatever their rank.  Certain police powers are also available to a limited extent to police community support officers and other non warranted positions such as police civilian investigators or designated detention officers employed by some police forces even though they are not constables.

There are several general powers constables have that normal members of the public do not, including:
the power to detain people in certain circumstances
the power to stop and search people/vehicles in certain circumstances
various powers of entry in certain circumstances
the power to seize and retain property in certain circumstances
the power to arrest people with or without warrant for any offence and in various other circumstances.  (A significantly wider power than that provided to members of the public, often described as "citizen's arrest")
the power to direct the behaviour of persons and vehicles on highways and in other public places
the power to demand name/address and certain documents of anyone driving a motor vehicle on a public road

The powers have various limits and generally require a clear reason for their exercise to be made known to a person subject of to one of the above powers, unless impractical due to the persons behavior or unusual circumstances.

Powers to stop and search can be extended on a limited (by place and duration) basis by legislation such as s.60 of the Criminal Justice and Public Order Act 1994 or ss.44-47 of the Terrorism Act 2000.

Once a person has been arrested his/her vehicle or residence can be searched without the need for a warrant to be obtained for the purpose of obtaining evidence connected to the offence causing the arrest, as long as the offence or suspected offence was indictable. This power is provided by Section 18(1) or 18(5) and/or 32(2) of PACE 1984 depending on the circumstances.  If a person is arrested in a premises or were in a premises immediately before arrest, Section 32(2) states a Constable has the power "to enter and search any premises in which he was when arrested or immediately before he was arrested for evidence relating to the offence". Constables and PCSOs also have the power under this section to search an individual for items that may assist or facilitate an escape from custody (i.e. an arrest or detention)

Source of powers

The basic powers of the police derive from the Police Act 1996, which covers attestation (section 29), jurisdiction (section 30) and a number of other matters.  Day to day, common law features greatly in relation to use of force (self defence & defence of others) and a number of other areas.  The Police and Criminal Evidence Act 1984 is a key piece of legislation in relation to policing which was amended by the Serious Organised Crime and Police Act 2005, significantly, in relation to powers of arrest. Another notable piece of legislation is the Police Reform Act 2002.  This act extended limited policing powers to those within the police family who are not warranted constables, such as PCSOs and others.

Detention
There are three different types of detention: 
detention without arrest,
detention after arrest (but before charge), and
detention after charge.

Detention without arrest
Detention without arrest is only permitted in certain circumstances, and is not a generally available power as in some other jurisdictions. In addition to the power to detain during a search (as described below) a Constable may detain a person under the following provisions:

Detention after arrest
Where a person is arrested for an offence, they will be taken to a police station. The custody officer at that police station must determine whether he has sufficient evidence to charge the detainee for the offence and may keep the detainee in custody until he can make this decision. The Custody Officer has sufficient evidence if he has sufficient evidence to provide a reasonable prospect of conviction. If the Custody Officer determines that he does have sufficient evidence, he must charge the person or release him. If he determines he does not have enough evidence to charge him he must release him unless he has reasonable grounds for believing that his detention without being charged is necessary to secure or preserve evidence relating to an offence for which he is under arrest or to obtain such evidence by questioning him.

In terrorism cases, a person may be detained for a maximum of 28 days. Otherwise (and subject to exceptions), a person may be detained for a maximum of 96 hours from the relevant time (normally the time an arrested person arrives at the first police station that he is taken to), in line with the following restrictions:

On expiry of the time limit, the arrested person must be released, either on or without police bail and may not be rearrested without warrant for the same offence unless new evidence has come to light since the original arrest.

Detention after charge
Following charge, a person may be detained in custody pending their trial or during their trial before sentencing.

Immediately after charge, if the detainee is not released (either on police bail or without bail), he must be brought before a magistrates' court as soon as is practicable (first appearance).

Treatment in detention
The treatment of suspects held in detention is governed by Code H to the Police and Criminal Evidence Act 1984 in the case of suspects related to terrorism and by Code C in other cases. It is generally the responsibility of a designated Custody Officer to ensure that the provisions of the relevant Code and of the Police and Criminal Evidence Act 1984 are not breached.

In particular, a person detained has the following rights; and must be informed of these rights at the earliest opportunity:
 to have one friend or relative or other person who is known to him or who is likely to take an interest in his welfare told that he has been arrested and where he is being detained; and
 to consult a solicitor.
 three meals a day
 drinks "on demand"
 eight hours of sleep/rest at night
 a clean cell

Some or all of these rights may be suspended in exceptional circumstances.

Search without warrant

Premises
A Constable may enter and search any premises occupied or controlled by a person who is under arrest for an indictable offence, if they have reasonable grounds for believing that there is on the premises evidence (other than items subject to legal privilege) that relates to that offence, or to some other indictable offence which is connected with or similar to that offence.  This power, under section 18(1) of PACE, requires the authority of a police officer of at least the rank of Inspector and is normally conducted whilst a person is in police custody at a police station.  Under PACE section 18(5), such a search of premises may be conducted prior to the arrested person being detained in police custody and prior to an authority by an Inspector if the presence of the person at a place (other than a police station) is necessary for the effective investigation of the offence.  However an Inspector must be informed following such a search.  This power is used much less than 18(1).

Under section 32 of PACE, a constable has the power, if a person has been arrested for an indictable offence, to enter and search any premises in which he was when arrested or immediately before s/he was arrested for evidence relating to the offence.

People or vehicles

Search without arrest
The Police and Criminal Evidence Act 1984 (PACE) was enacted to correct problems with the implementation of the powers used by the police. The "sus" law allowed police to stop, search, and subsequently arrest a 'suspected person' without warrant, reason or evidence.  Due to the unfair implementation of this law within the black community, there were riots in some parts of the country in majority black areas (Brixton, Handsworth, Toxteth, Southall & Moss Side) in the early 1980s and "sus" was repealed in 1981. The vast majority of search powers now require "reasonable suspicion" of an offence to be present, although this has not prevented stop-and-search from being used disproportionately against black people, who are over nine times more likely to be searched than white people, Asian people nearly three times more likely to be searched and BAME members in general four times more likely. This disparity can also be seen when looking at arrests, as a black person is over three times as likely to be arrested and the whole BAME group being nearly twice as likely. Constables cannot carry out "consensual" searches of a person unless a power to search exists.

Before searching anyone or anything (except an unattended vehicle), a Constable in plain clothes must identify himself as a Constable and show his warrant card or similar, and a Constable (in uniform or otherwise) must state:
the Constable's rank/grade, collar/warrant number, surname and the name of the police station to which he is attached,
the legal power being used to conduct the search,
that the detained person is detained for the purpose of a search,
the object being searched for (if applicable),
the grounds for the search, and
that a copy of the search form will be available on demand for three months.

Before searching an unattended vehicle, a Constable must leave a notice (inside the vehicle unless it is not reasonably practicable to do so without damaging the vehicle) stating:
that the vehicle has been searched,
the name of the police station to which the Constable is attached,
that an application for compensation for any damage caused by the search may be made to that police station, and
that a copy of the search record will be available on demand (if one was made).
The above provisions do not apply to searches under section 6 of PACE or section 27(2) of the Aviation Security Act 1982, which both relate to vehicles leaving goods handling areas where searches are routine.

A search without arrest is unlawful if it appears to the Constable, after first detaining the person or vehicle, that the search is not required or it is impracticable. A person or vehicle may be detained for the purposes of a search for as long as is reasonably required to permit a search to be carried out either at the place where the person or vehicle was first detained or nearby. Whilst in public, a Constable cannot require a person to remove any of his clothing other than an outer coat, jacket or gloves (except in the case of a search under sections 43, 43A or 47A of the Terrorism Act 2000, which additionally permits the removal of footwear and headgear). The powers to search are as follows:

Search after arrest
A Constable may search a person who has been arrested (unless the arrest was at a police station) if the Constable has reasonable grounds for believing that the arrested person may present a danger to himself or others. A Constable may also (unless the arrest was at a police station) search an arrested person for anything which he might use to assist him to escape from lawful custody, or which might be evidence relating to an offence.

This power is given to both Constables and PCSOs by Section 32 of the Police and Criminal Evidence act 1984.

A Constable may search a person arrested under section 41 of the Terrorism Act 2000 to discover whether he has in his possession anything which may constitute evidence that he is a terrorist (defined by section 40).

Searches in detention
The Custody Officer must record everything which an arrested person has with him at the police station and may search a person to the extent that he considers it necessary to do so, but may not conduct an intimate search for these purposes. The Custody Officer may seize anything, but may only seize clothes or personal effects if the Custody Officer:
 believes that the person from whom they are seized may use them:
 to cause physical injury to himself or any other person,
 to damage property,
 to interfere with evidence,
 to assist him to escape, or
 has reasonable grounds for believing that they may be evidence relating to an offence.

An Inspector also has a limited power to order a search of an arrested person in order to facilitate establishing the identity of a person, particularly by discovering tattoos or other marks. Where such a search requires more than the removal of the arrested person's outer clothing, the provisions of Code C to the Police and Criminal Evidence Act 1984 relating to strip searches apply.

An intimate search is a search of the bodily orifices (other than the mouth). It should be conducted by a suitably qualified person unless this is impracticable and done in the presence of two other people. An intimate search requires the authorisation of an inspector and may only be made in one of the following circumstances:

Stop and account

Stop and account" is a standard operating procedure, rather than a power, of the police, under Recommendation 61 (Rec.61); it is not a statutory procedure like stop and search. It applies to people on foot in a public place. There is no power to force a person to stop, or to detain them. The decision to "request" a person to "stop and account" is left to the discretion of the individual officer; there is no guidance on this. Unlike stop and search, there is no requirement for "reasonable suspicion". There is no actual requirement on a police officer, beyond identifying themself as such; no need to tell the persons stopped why they are being asked to account for themselves, or to say that they are free to leave without answering questions. However, police forces have procedures governing stops. While a record must be made of every stop, there is no requirement for police forces to keep statistics on number of stops or ethnicity of people stopped, according to the College of Policing.

Advice to the public on the West Midlands Police website explains:

Different police forces have different documents, and forms for recording stops. According to the Metropolitan Police the documented stop and account procedure was recommended after the Stephen Lawrence Inquiry found that stopping people informally, as had been the usual procedure, "created a barrier between the police and the community. These stops were not monitored and no records were kept."
The Home Office said in 2013 that stop and account was not a defined power set out in primary legislation, but an "important part of on-street policing. ... It constitutes the next step beyond the general conversations officers have with members of the public every day."

Power of seizure

The main power of seizure a constable (and PCSO also since 2012) has is provided by Section 19 of PACE 1984. This provides a general power of seizure for anything that has he/she has reasonable grounds for believing was obtained during the commission of an offence and that the seizure is necessary to stop it being concealed, lost, damaged or destroyed. The same section also provides a power of seizure of items suspected to be evidence of an offence.

Other powers also exist, such as customs powers which provide a Constable, Customs Officer or any member of HM Armed Forces or Coastguard the ability to seize, retain and condemn goods under the Customs and Excise Management Act 1979

Arrest without warrant

The only powers of detention that are available to a constable in England and Wales are discussed above. A constable's power of arrest is provided by the following sources:

Common law – to prevent a breach of the peace
Section 49 of the Prison Act 1952
Section 32 Children & Young Persons Act 1969
Immigration Act 1971
Section 7 of the Bail Act 1976
Section 1 & Section 13 of the Magistrates' Courts Act 1980 (warrants)
Section 136 of the Mental Health Act 1983
Section 24 Police Criminal Evidence Act 1984
Section 46A Police Criminal Evidence Act 1984
Section 31 Police Criminal Evidence Act 1984
Section 6D of the Road Traffic Act 1988
Section 41 of the Terrorism Act 2000
Section 9 of Anti-social Behaviour, Crime and Policing Act 2014

Whether being arrested, detained or spoken to about an offence or suspected offence, Section 10 Code C of PACE states that the caution must be used. When used in conjunction with an arrest the suspect:
 must be told that he is under arrest, and
must be "told in simple, non-technical language that he could understand, the essential legal and factual grounds for his arrest" including why the arrest in itself is necessary
A person must be "cautioned" when being arrested unless this is impractical due to the behaviour or condition of the arrestee, such as drunkenness or unresponsive. There is also a requirement to caution an individual when they are also suspected of a criminal offence but are not being subject to arrest at that time. The caution is:You do not have to say anything, but it may harm your defence if you do not mention when questioned something which you may later rely on in court. Anything you do say may be given in evidence.
Deviation from this accepted form is permitted provided that the same information is conveyed. There also exists the "when" caution (above), "now" caution and a "restricted" caution. The "when" caution is generally used during an arrest or interview on the street or at a police station. The "now" caution is most commonly used when charging or issuing an FPN or PND.

Persons other than constables "who are charged with the duty of investigating offences or charging offenders" (e.g. escort officers, detention officers, DWP fraud investigators, PCSOs, IPCC investigators, etc.) have a duty to adhere to any relevant provisions of the codes of practice as per Section 67(9) PACE.

There are three general means of arresting without warrant: firstly in relation to a criminal offence, secondly in relation to a breach of the peace and thirdly for miscellaneous purposes.

Criminal offences
Prior to 1967, the only general power of arrest for offences was that which existed for felonies. In 1964, Home Secretary Rab Butler asked the Criminal Law Revision Committee to look into the distinction between felonies and misdemeanours, and their recommendation was that the distinction be abolished, as it was obsolete. As most powers of arrest relied on the offence being a felony, a new set of arrest criteria were introduced by the Criminal Law Act 1967, which created the arrestable offence (defined as an offence where an adult could be sentenced to imprisonment for five years or more).

These arrest powers were later re-enacted by the Police and Criminal Evidence Act 1984 (PACE), which also created an alternative set of arrest criteria (the "general arrest criteria") which applied in particular circumstances, such as where the person's name or address were not known. As time went on, the number of offences that were defined as "arrestable" grew significantly, to the point where the distinction was becoming confusing and unworkable.

In 2005, the PACE powers of arrest were repealed by the Serious Organised Crime and Police Act, which also abolished the arrestable offence and instead replaced it with a need-tested system for arrest which applied to every offence.

A constable may therefore arrest (without a warrant):
anyone who is about to commit an offence, or anyone whom he has reasonable grounds for suspecting to be about to commit an offence,
anyone who is in the act of committing an offence, or anyone whom he has reasonable grounds for suspecting to be committing an offence, and
anyone who is guilty of an offence or anyone whom he has reasonable grounds for suspecting to be guilty of an offence.

Additionally, if a constable suspects that an offence has been committed, then:
anyone whom he has reasonable grounds to suspect of being guilty of it.

Conditions (a.k.a. arrest necessity test criteria)
Under Code G of PACE, a constable may only use the powers of arrest given above:

(a) to enable the name of the person in question to be ascertained (in the case where the constable does not know, and cannot readily ascertain, the person's name, or has reasonable grounds for doubting whether a name given by the person as his name is his real name),
(b) correspondingly as regards the person's address,
(c) to prevent the person in question:
causing physical injury to himself or any other person,
suffering physical injury,
causing loss of or damage to property,
committing an offence against public decency (only where members of the public going about their normal business cannot reasonably be expected to avoid the person in question), or
causing an unlawful obstruction of the highway;
(d) to protect a child or other vulnerable person from the person in question,
(e) to allow the prompt and effective investigation of the offence or of the conduct of the person in question:
when interviewing the suspect on occasions when the person's voluntary attendance is not considered to be a practicable alternative to arrest, because for example:
it is thought unlikely that the person would attend the police station voluntarily to be interviewed;
it is necessary to interview the suspect about the outcome of other investigative action for which their arrest is necessary;
arrest would enable the special warning to be given in accordance with Code C paragraphs 10.10 and 10.11 when the suspect fails to account or refuses to account for the circumstances where they are:
in possession of incriminating objects, or at a place where such objects are found;
at or near the scene of the crime at or about the time it was committed.
the person has made false statements and/or presented false evidence;
it is thought likely that the person:
may steal or destroy evidence;
may collude or make contact with, co-suspects or conspirators;
may intimidate or threaten or make contact with, witnesses.
when considering arrest in connection with the investigation of an indictable offence (see Note 6), there is a need:
to enter and search without a search warrant any premises occupied or controlled by the arrested person or where the person was when arrested or immediately before arrest;
to prevent the arrested person from having contact with others;
to detain the arrested person for more than 24 hours before charge
when considering arrest in connection with any recordable offence and it is necessary to secure or preserve evidence of that offence by taking fingerprints, footwear impressions or samples from the suspect for evidential comparison or matching with other material relating to that offence, for example, from the crime scene.
when considering arrest in connection with any offence and it is necessary to search, examine or photograph the person to obtain evidence
(f) or to prevent any prosecution for the offence from being hindered by the disappearance of the person in question.

Notes 2A to 2J provide further clarification on the above:
In relation to (a) above, where mobile fingerprinting is available and the suspect's name cannot be ascertained/is in doubt, consideration should be given using the power under 61(6A) of PACE (Code D para. 4.3(e)) to take and check the fingerprints of a suspect as this may avoid the need to arrest solely to enable a name to be ascertained.

In the instances above of being unable to ascertain name/address, causing physical injury to himself or other person, offences against public decency, obstruction of the highway, note 2D of Code G states that a warning should be considered before arrest in order to perhaps avoid the arrest or in order to clarify the justification for arrest by way of demonstrating the intent to commit the crime and therefore rebut any defence that they were acting reasonably.

The meaning of "prompt" under the "prompt and effective investigation" is held to be reviewed on a case-by-case basis and consideration should be given to street bailing the suspect rather than arresting them. Released on bail criteria are covered partly under 30A of PACE.

Voluntary attendance at a police station at a later date negates the need to arrest for the prompt and effective investigation when there is no suggestion that the suspect will not attend and if the suspect's name/address can be ascertained. When the person attends the police station for a voluntary interview, their arrest on arrival at the station prior to interview would only be justified if new information came to light after arrangements were made indicates that from that time, voluntary attendance ceased to be a practicable alternative and the person's arrest became necessary and it was not reasonably practicable for the person to be arrested before they attended the station.

If a person who attends for a voluntary interview decides to leave before the interview is complete, the police would at that point be entitled to consider whether their arrest was necessary to carry out the interview. The possibility that the person might decide to leave during the interview is therefore not a valid reason for arresting them before the interview has commenced. See Code C paragraph 3.16

Section 29(a) PACE states a person attending a police station or other place for a voluntary attendance is free to leave at any time unless he/she is placed under arrest. They are also to be immediately informed they are under arrest if a decision is made to arrest them to prevent them from leaving by the constable.

The necessity test has been held to have been incorrectly applied in the following instances, which are therefore unlawful arrests: Richardson v Chief Constable of West Midlands Police (2011), Alexander, Farrelly et al. judicial review (2009).

Section 30 of PACE states that any person arrested in a place other than a police station must be taken to a police station as soon as practicable after the arrest. This section also states that if at any time before reaching the police station, a constable is satisfied there are no grounds for keeping that person under arrest, they must be released without bail immediately and a record of this must be made. This section does not state that the original constable should release the individual if they become satisfied there is no reason to hold the suspect, but the section states that "a Constable" may become satisfied, which suggests that this may be a different constable than who made the original arrest.

Bail

When an offender is arrested and later released, bail conditions are often applied under Section 30(1) of PACE, which state the constable may impose bail conditions which as appear to the constable to be necessary:
 to secure that the person surrenders to custody
 to secure that the person does not commit an offence while on bail
 to secure that the person does not interfere with witnesses or otherwise obstruct the course of justice, whether in relation to himself or any other person
 for the person's own protection or, if the person is under the age of 18, for the person's own welfare or in the person's own interests

Other PACE arrest provisions

Although not part of the Codes of Practice as such, PACE itself does outlaw certain other practices, such as:

 Section 76 / 76A / 77 - concerns the unreliability of confessions gained through unfair or unreliable means
 Section 78 - concerns exclusion of unfair evidence

Breach of the peace
Breach of the peace is one of the oldest, and most basic offences still in existence in England & Wales. It is an offence at common law, not codified, so it cannot be found in any act of Parliament. The power of arrest in relation to breach of the peace is available to anyone (regardless of whether they are a constable or not), who may arrest without warrant:
any person who commits a breach of the peace in his presence, or
if they reasonably believe that a breach of the peace is about to occur or is imminent, any person in order to prevent that.

However, the Court of Appeal laid down the following conditions:
there must be a real and present threat to the peace justifying depriving a citizen, not acting unlawfully at the time, of his liberty,
the threat must come from the person arrested,
the conduct must clearly interfere with the rights of others and its natural consequence must be not wholly unreasonable violence from a third party, and
the conduct of the person arrested must be unreasonable.

Other powers of arrest
There are few powers of arrest without warrant where an offence is not either known or suspected to have been committed. A constable may arrest a person:

Absconding or going AWOL
who he has reasonable cause to suspect of being:
an officer or rating of the Royal Navy,
an officer, warrant officer, non-commissioned officer or airman of the Royal Air Force,
an officer, warrant officer, non-commissioned officer or soldier of the British Army,
who has deserted or is absent without leave,
who is unlawfully at large from a civilian prison, secure accommodation or young offenders institution or military prison,
who has failed to answer bail or street bail,
who has absconded whilst on remand for a report on their mental condition, on remand for treatment or subject to an interim hospital order under the Mental Health Act 1983,
who has absconded whilst being transferred to or from the United Kingdom under a prisoner transfer agreement, or
who has absconded from a place of safety to which he has been taken under the Powers of Criminal Courts (Sentencing) Act 2000 or from local authority accommodation in which he is required to live, or to which he has been remanded or committed.

Alcohol and driving
who has provided a positive sample of breath (or has failed to provide any sample at all) under the Road Traffic or Transport and Works Acts, or
who:
has been required to provide a sample of breath, blood or urine under section 7 or section 7A of the Road Traffic Act 1988 (that is to say, an evidential, not a preliminary breath test)
the constable believes is over the prescribed limit or is unfit to drive, and
is likely to drive or attempt to drive a vehicle.

Other powers
to take fingerprints after a conviction
who has failed to comply with a conditional caution,
who has committed an offence against bylaws made under the Military Lands Act 1892,
who he reasonably suspects of being a "terrorist".
who he reasonably suspects of breaching any bail conditions

Reasonable force
A constable's power to use reasonable force is provided by the following law / statutory instruments:

 common law
 Article 2 European Convention on Human Rights 1953 
 Section 3 Criminal Law Act 1967
 Section 117 PACE 1984
 "generally acceptable conduct" - Collins v. Wilcock (1984)
 Section 76 of the Criminal Justice and Immigration Act 2008
Section 139B of the Criminal Justice Act 1988
Section 53 of the Offensive Weapons Act 2019
Section 143 of the Licensing Act 2003

Common law has most recently affirmed the use of force in Beckford v R (1987), in which Lord Griffiths affirmed that "the test to be applied for self-defence is that a person may use such force as is reasonable in the circumstances as he honestly believes them to be in the defence of himself or another". A more general explanation of what is reasonable was also made four years prior in 1984 under Collins v. Wilcock (1984) 1 WLR 1172 DC, which stated that a Constable may use force not otherwise covered by legislation or other law if it they "had been acting within the bounds of what was generally acceptable in the ordinary conduct of daily life".

The European Convention on Human Rights 1953 further states:
"2. Deprivation of life shall not be regarded as inflicted in contravention of this article when it results from the use of force which is no more than absolutely necessary:
a. in defence of any person from unlawful violence;b. in order to effect a lawful arrest or to prevent the escape of a person lawfully detained;c. in action lawfully taken for the purpose of quelling a riot or insurrection.''"

The Criminal Law Act 1967 allows any person to use reasonable force in the circumstances in the prevention of crime, effecting or assisting the lawful arrest of offenders or suspected offenders or of persons unlawfully at large.

The Police and Criminal Evidence Act 1984 provides a power for a Constable to use reasonable force when they are lawfully using a power under the same act.

The Criminal Justice and Immigration Act 2008 further clarified the use of force as per the above, but also reiterated force may still be reasonable if it was influenced by an honestly held, albeit mistaken belief.

The Criminal Justice Act 1988 gives a Constable the power to enter a school premises and search those premises and any person for offensive weapons, allowing them to use reasonable force if necessary to do so.

The Offensive Weapons Act 2019 gives a Constable power to use reasonable force, "if necessary", in order to search and seize relevant articles in a school or further education premises for "corrosive substances".

Powers of entry
A constable has a right of entry to private land in three broad circumstances: by consent, without consent, and without consent and by force.

In English law, "consent" in relation to trespass includes situations where a licence (i.e. permission to enter onto land) is implied without having to be explicitly stated: for example, walking through a private garden to reach the front door of a house for the purpose of delivering a letter. Where consent has not been granted by the occupier, entry without consent may be exercised where a search warrant has been issued, or in other specific circumstances where the matter is urgent or serious, and the power has been specifically granted by law. The police have the power to use reasonable force to enter under a warrant, and under the other powers of entry discussed below.

Search warrants
There are known to be around 900 provisions in law under which search warrants may be issued. Typically, these permit a police officer and/or other official (typically a council officer, or an officer of a government department) to enter and search premises, using force if necessary, and seize evidence. These are generally issued by a justice of the peace following a written application stating the reasons for entering. As a general rule, search warrants are only issued where access cannot be gained by consent, or where attempting to gain consent might lead to evidence being destroyed, etc.

Other powers of entry
Other than with a search warrant, a constable may enter premises only in specific circumstances, almost all of which are listed in section 17 of the Police and Criminal Evidence Act 1984 ("PACE"), which largely codified and replaced the historic common law provisions as to entry and search. In addition to powers under section 17 PACE, a small number of other Acts provide a power of entry (and search) without a warrant.

Where a power to enter and search for the purpose of arresting or recapturing a person comes from section 17 PACE, it is only exercisable if the constable has reasonable grounds for believing that the person whom he is seeking is on the premises. "Reasonable belief" is a higher threshold than that required to arrest a person, which only requires "reasonable suspicion". Therefore, there must be some fact that causes the constable to believe that the person in question is present at the time - for example, seeing a person present who matches their description, or being told that they are present.

A power to enter and search under section 17 for the purpose of arresting or recapturing a person is also limited, in relation to premises consisting of two or more separate dwellings, to entering and searching common areas (such as shared hallways, landings and stairways) and the dwelling in question, but not other dwellings in the same premises.

The power of search conferred by section 17 is only a power to search to the extent that is reasonably required for the purpose for which the power of entry is exercised. Therefore, a power to search for a person who is wanted would not include a power to search for evidence of the offence for which they are wanted. However, as the constable would be lawfully on the premises, if he were to come across such evidence in his search for the person it could still be seized under section 19 of PACE, and should the constable find and arrest the person who is wanted, he could then search the premises for evidence of the offence.

PACE defines "premises" as including any place and, in particular, includes any vehicle, vessel, aircraft or hovercraft, an offshore installation (such as an oil rig), a renewable energy installation (such as a wind turbine), and a tent or movable structure.

Other powers

Road checks
A uniformed constable, PCSO or traffic officer may stop any vehicle at any time under section 163 of the Road Traffic Act 1988. However, if a constable wishes, for one of the reasons given below, to stop all vehicles or certain vehicles selected by any criterion, then they must do so under the power granted by section 4 of the Police and Criminal Evidence Act 1984. A road check is normally only authorised by a police officer of the rank of superintendent or above, in which case the restrictions given in the second column apply. However, if it appears to an officer below the rank of superintendent that a road check is required (for one of the reasons below) as a matter of urgency, then he may authorise it himself. In this case, the conditions given in the second column do not apply.

If an officer below the rank of superintendent gives authorisation, it must be referred to a superintendent as soon as it is practicable to do so. Where a superintendent gives authorisation for a road check, he:
must specify a period, not exceeding seven days, during which the road check may continue, and
may direct that the road check shall be continuous, or shall be conducted at specified times during that period.
If it appears to an officer of the rank of superintendent or above that a road check ought to continue beyond the period for which it has been authorised he may specify a further period, not exceeding seven days, during which it may continue.

In addition to the powers to conduct road checks given above, the police have a common law power to set up road checks and search vehicles stopped at them in order to prevent a breach of the peace.

Removal of disguises
Under section 60AA Criminal Justice and Public Order Act 1994, if:
an authorisation under section 60 of the Act (searching for weapons) is on force, or
an inspector issues an authorisation under section 60AA on the grounds that he reasonably believes that:
activities are going to take place in a certain part of his police area,
those activities will involve offences being committed, and
to prevent or control those offences it is necessary to order the removal of disguises,

then a Constable in uniform can:
require a person to remove any item which the Constable reasonably believes that person is wearing wholly or mainly for the purpose of concealing his identity, and
seize any item which the Constable reasonably believes any person intends to wear wholly or mainly for that purpose.

Authorisations apply to one locality only, last for 24 hours, and the inspector who gives them must inform a superintendent as soon as possible. A superintendent can extend the authorisation for a further 24 hours. Failure to remove a disguise when required is an offence.

Power to direct a person to leave

A Constable has the power to direct a person to leave a place if he believes that the person is in the place prohibited by a court order or condition as provided by the Section 112 of the Serious Organised Crime and Police Act 2005

A further power to direct someone to leave exists under Section 35 of the Anti-social Behaviour, Crime and Policing Act 2014. This allows a Constable the ability to direct a person to leave if he reasonably suspects the behaviour of the person is causing or likely to cause members of the public in the locality being harassed, alarmed or distressed or that the person will contribute in the locality of crime or disorder. Conditions to this are found under Section 34 & 36.

Other reasons to direct a person or persons to leave an area are also available, e.g. to dissuade someone from committing further offences (as required by Code G of PACE), to prevent someone from obstructing the highway, removing someone from a crime scene, etc.

Photographing suspects

Section 61 of PACE allows a Constable to take a suspect's fingerprints without consent when he suspects someone has or is committing an offence and there is a doubt about the suspect's name.

Power to demand name/address for anti-social behaviour

Section 50 of Police Reform Act 2002 allows a Constable in uniform to require a person to give his name and address if they have reason to believe they have been, or are acting in an anti-social manner. This power is also available to PCSOs and others.

The definition of anti-social behavior is provided by Section 2 Anti-social behaviour, Crime and Policing Act 2014:

Notes

See also
 Constable
 Individuals with powers of arrest
 Police officer
 Self-defence in English law

References
  This article contains quotations from Police and Criminal Evidence Act 1984 (PACE) Code G, Revised Code of Practice for the Statutory Power of Arrest by Police Officers, which is available under the  Open Government Licence v3.0. © Crown copyright.

External links
 Directgov Being stopped, questioned or arrested by the police (Directgov, England and Wales)
 Kent Police guide on reasonable force

Law enforcement in England and Wales
Searches and seizures
English criminal law